Mike & The Mechanics is the fifth studio album by Mike + The Mechanics, released in 1999. As the name is easily confused with the 1985 album (the first used the plus sign [+]; this uses the ampersand [&]) Mike + The Mechanics, it is also referred to as M6 (i.e., the sixth album by the group, including the Hits compilation). It includes the top 40 hit "Now That You've Gone".

This was the last studio album with Paul Young, who died the year after its release; the group did not release another album until Rewired in 2004.

The album was not officially released in North America and is only available as an import there. However, the band's former US label Atlantic Records is still thanked in the liner notes.

Track listing

Personnel 
Mike and The Mechanics
 Mike Rutherford – electric guitars, bass guitar, backing vocals 
 Paul Carrack – lead vocals (1, 2, 4, 5, 7, 9, 10, 12), backing vocals, keyboards, electric guitars, drums
 Paul Young – lead vocals (3, 6, 8, 11, 13), backing vocals, percussion
 Gary Wallis – drums, programming

Additional personnel
 Oskar Paul – programming
 Steve Pigott – programming
 Matthew Vaughan – programming
 Simon Hale – string arrangements and conductor 
 Sharon Woolf – backing vocals
 
Technical and Design
 Nick Davis – engineer (1, 3, 5, 6, 7, 9-12), mixing (1, 3-13)
 Mark Taylor – engineer (2), mixing (2)
 Simon Hurrell – engineer (4, 8, 13)
 Ian Huffam – additional engineer (1, 3, 5, 6, 7, 9-12)
 Wherefore Art? – Cover design

References 

Mike + The Mechanics albums
1999 albums
Albums produced by Mike Rutherford
Virgin Records albums
Albums produced by Mark Taylor (music producer)
Albums produced by Brian Rawling